Busselton Margaret River Airport , formerly known as Busselton Regional Airport and alternatively known as Busselton-Margaret River Regional Airport, is located in the Busselton suburb of Yalyalup,  from the Busselton town centre.

History
The airport was opened on 15 March 1997 and replaced Busselton Aerodrome, established in 1940, that was used extensively during World War II. A largely government-subsidised air service ran from Perth Airport to Busselton from 1997 to 2001 (including Margaret River Airport from 1999); it was operated by Skywest Airlines (now Virgin Australia Regional Airlines), Maroomba Airlines, and Skippers Aviation. In 2007, mining company Rio Tinto launched its first flight from the airport for fly-in fly-out workers at its mines. Skywest Airlines/Virgin Australia Regional Airlines ran a service from Perth to Albany Airport via Busselton from July 2011 until December 2014, before scaling it back to a Perth-Busselton route and cancelling it altogether in April 2015.

Between June and December 2014, upgrades to the terminal were made. In June 2015, funding was allocated for further upgrades and redevelopment of the airport. As part of the funding agreement, Margaret River was officially added to the title of the airport in October 2015. In 2017, the airport commenced the $69.7 million redevelopment which included:

 lengthening, widening and strengthening of the existing runway to facilitate Code E aircraft;
 a new 4 bay Code E aircraft parking apron and connecting taxiways;
 a new passenger terminal;
 a new general aviation precinct;
 upgrades to the existing Code C apron
 new aeronautical ground lighting;
 new parking facilities;
 upgrades to the internal road network; and
 infrastructure to support the development of freight and commercial opportunities.

As part of the development, a new terminal building was proposed to be built in front of the new Code E Apron to help facilitate future interstate and international services. In early 2018, the Western Australian government placed the construction of the new terminal building on hold until a major commercial airline committed to interstate services that were shown to be viable. In June 2019, it was reported that Jetstar Airways were the most likely to begin a Busselton-Melbourne route within six to nine months. This route was confirmed in September 2019, with a heavily subsidised Jetstar service that was to begin in March 2020. As a result of the route confirmation, the Western Australian government announced it would spend an extra $3.2 million upgrading the airport's terminal. The route was postponed eight times due to the ongoing coronavirus pandemic. Flights began as part of a three-year trial of the route on 6 April 2022, after the reopening of the Western Australian border (see COVID-19 pandemic in Western Australia). The terminal upgrade was also postponed until after the three-year trial period.

In April 2019, the airport was designated as an international alternate airport to Perth; previously the closest airports with this designation were Learmonth and Adelaide.

In 2023, there were renewed calls to upgrade the terminal before the conclusion of the three-year trial period after the success of the new route and increases in mining flights, with annual passenger numbers jumping from 25,000 before the pandemic to 95,000 by 2023.

Airlines and destinations

Facilities
Busselton Margaret River Airport has a single 2,460 metre long by 45 metre wide runway (03/21) and is rated at Code E with capability to handle aircraft the size and weight of the Airbus A330.

Precision Approach Path Indicator (PAPI) is available for both ends and low-intensity runway lights can be activated by radio (Pilot Controlled Lighting). Two illuminated windsocks are on site.

Non-precision instrument approaches include GNSS (GPS) approaches to both runways, and a sole NDB (ADF) approach to runway 21.

See also
 List of airports in Western Australia
 Aviation transport in Australia

References

External links

 
 Airservices Aerodromes & Procedure Charts

Airports in Western Australia
Busselton
Airports established in 1997
1997 establishments in Australia